The construction of the California High-Speed Rail system is an undertaking by the California High-Speed Rail Authority.

 Phase 1 (totaling about ) runs from the metropolitan area of the San Francisco Bay Area in northern California to the metropolitan area of Greater Los Angeles in southern California. It has been under construction in the San Joaquin Valley since 2015, and in "bookend" investments in the two metropolitan areas, and will take an as-yet unknown number of years to complete.
 Phase 2 extends the system north to Sacramento, and south through the Inland Empire to San Diego.

Funding for all of the Phase 1 construction has not been secured yet, and Phase 2 is only in the preliminary planning stage.

Due to financial constraints, the Authority is implementing an Interim Initial Operating Segment (IOS) in the San Joaquin Valley (improving on existing Amtrak service). This will be a financially self-sustaining system. The next goal of the Authority is to extend the system west and north to San Francisco.

Current construction status

In the Central Valley major construction projects are underway. Three separate construction packages total 119 miles of guideway and 93 structures. As of October 2022, 49 miles of guideway are complete, and 39 are underway; 35 structures are complete, and 34 are underway. Exhibit 2.6 from the 2022 Business Plan gives an overall comparison between the packages as of Mar. 31, 2022.
CP4 comprises  adjoining the end of CP2-3 to the intersection of Poplar / Madera Avenue northwest of Shafter. It includes at-grade embankments, retained-fill over-crossings, viaducts, aerial sections of the high-speed rail alignment, and the relocation of four miles of existing Burlington Northern Santa Fe (BNSF) tracks. The contractor is California Rail Builders, a joint venture of Ferrovial-Agroman West, LLC and Griffith Company. The design-build contract was signed February 29, 2016. This construction package is forecast to be completed first, by Mar. 21, 2023.

CP1 comprises  from Avenue 17 north of Madera to East American Avenue south of Fresno. It includes 12 grade separations, two viaducts, one tunnel, a major river crossing over the San Joaquin River, and the realignment of State Route 99. The contractor is the joint venture of Tutor-Perini/Zachry/Parsons. The design-build contract was signed August 16, 2013. This construction package is forecast to be completed next, 33 months later (Dec. 31, 2025).
It includes approximately 36 grade separations, viaducts, underpasses, and overpasses. The contractor is the joint venture of Dragados USA/Flatiron Construction. The design-build contract was signed June 10, 2015. This construction package is forecast to be completed last, 3 months later (Mar. 21, 2026).

Per the 2023 Project Status Report (released Feb. 18, 20230):
 CP1 Seven of eight major commercial issues noted in 2022 Business Plan have resolved, and only Church Avenue remains. The completion date has been pushed back to 2026.
 CP2-3 Three of four major commercial issues noted in 2022 Business Plan have been resolved, and the last one (Cross Creek) is in arbitration. The completion date has been pushed back to 2026.
 CP4 The one major commercial issue noted in the 2022 Business Plan has been resolved. The completion date has been pushed back to summer 2023.

 Finishing the 119-mile Construction Packages:
 "The Authority now has over 96% of right-of-way in hand, has completed design of the 119-mile HSR civil infrastructure, and has completed 53% of utility relocations, with another 19% underway. The new estimates for this existing construction work represent updates from major final design elements being incorporated into construction contracts via change orders and updates due to global inflation and new construction schedules – due in part to COVID-19. To complete current civil contracts and related work, $2.2 billion is added to the 2022 Business Plan estimate."
 New Contracts/Work to Complete Merced to Bakersfield:
 "The Authority is also looking towards new procurements for civil construction to Merced and Bakersfield, the track and systems work, stations, and finally trainsets. We are already approaching the extensions differently by advancing design to the configuration-level, which is generally about 30 percent, and will procure right-of-way in advance of construction work."

 Cost updates for new contracts are:

Other planned work in the valley includes:
Extensions of the line from the above central section to Bakersfield and Merced, totaling , are also progressing through advanced design work, right-of-way mapping, and identification of utility relocation work. Construction contracts have not yet been let.
The Heavy Maintenance Facility (HMF) is proceeding through the planning and approval process.

"Bookend" investments are also underway to the north and south:
The Caltrain electrification "bookend" investment  in the Bay Area (as well as grade separations, etc.) is proceeding, and is expected to be completed in late 2024.
A "bookend" investment in the "Link US" project (Phase A) will shortly begin construction for Los Angeles Union Station. Phase B still needs to be funded. (There are also other "bookend" investments which are in progress.)

History of construction

Historical construction milestones
 On December 2, 2010, the Authority Board of Directors voted to begin construction on the first section of the system (in the Central Valley).
 On July 19, 2012, Governor Jerry Brown signed legislation approving construction of the high-speed system.
 On January 6, 2015 the City of Fresno hosted a groundbreaking ceremony to mark the commencement of sustained construction activities.

History of projected construction timelines
The 2008 Business Plan projected that construction for the entire project would be completed by 2030.

The 2012 Business Plan projected HSR service between Los Angeles and San Francisco would not be available until 2029.

The 2016 Business Plan projected:

 By 2018: The Initial Construction Segment (ICS) would be completed –  – Merced to Bakersfield.
 By 2022: Initial Operating Section (IOS) would be completed –  – Merced to Burbank
 By 2027: Bay to Basin would be completed –  – San Jose & Merced to Burbank
 By 2029: Phase 1 Blended would be completed –  – San Francisco to Los Angeles/Anaheim

The 2018 Business Plan projected HSR service between Los Angeles and San Francisco will not be available until 2033.

The 2020 Business Plan projected HSR service between Silicon Valley and the Central Valley would be operational by late 2031, and that service between Los Angeles and San Francisco will be operational in 2033.

The 2022 Business Plan does not have a projected timeline for completion of any of the segments other than the Interim IOS, recognizing that financial constraints make such an estimate unpredictable. Table 5.0 gives estimates of costs to finish the construction in year of expenditure dollars, but assumes that there would be no major delays.

Initial construction approvals
On December 2, 2010, the Authority Board of Directors voted to begin construction on the first section of the system from Madera to Fresno, known as the Initial Construction Segment (ICS). Five "construction packages" are currently being planned for this section. With the Design-Build contractual system the Authority is using, the contractor will be responsible for the final construction design elements, following the guidelines and specifications of the contract.  The intent of this (as explained by Dan Richard, chair of the Authority) is to minimize last minute design change orders arising during the construction process (which tend to add to expenses and slow construction).

On December 20, 2010, due to the infusion of an additional $616 million in federal funds reallocated from states that canceled their high-speed rail plans, the initial segment of construction was extended to Bakersfield. Another $300 million was reallocated on May 9, 2011, extending the funded portion north to the future Chowchilla Wye (where trains can be turned).

In September 2012, the Obama administration gave California's high-speed rail project the green light to streamline the permitting process for the  section of the project which starts just north of Fresno in Madera County and runs south to Bakersfield.

On August 12, 2014 the federal Surface Transportation Board approved the HSR route from Fresno to Bakersfield. This was the final approval needed before beginning construction.

Also, on December 15, 2014 the federal Surface Transportation Board determined (using well-understood preemption rules) that its approval of the HSR project in August "categorically preexempts" lawsuits filed under the California Environmental Quality Act (CEQA). This cleared the last obstacle before construction could begin. However, this supposition is still being tested in the California courts in a similar case, Friends of Eel River v. North Coast Railroad Authority.

On June 10, 2015 the Authority authorized a "Rail Delivery Partner" contract to be negotiated and signed by the CEO, valued at up to $700 million, for services through 2022. This is a successor to the support provided by the current Project Management Team contract. The RDP will provide engineering and management services to see the project from a planning mode into a construction mode. The RDP partnership under the lead of Parsons Brinckerhoff includes Network Rail Consulting (the international consulting arm of the UK rail authority) and LeighFisher (a global management firm with extensive experience in infrastructure and advisory services). The other partnership competing was under Bechtel Infrastructure Corporation.

Awarding initial construction packages (San Joaquin Valley segments)
CP1. The contract is valued at approximately $985 million, plus an additional $53 million in provisional sums. Construction was originally expected to begin in 2013, but was delayed by the slow pace of property acquisition.

CP2-3. Dragados of Spain, with Flatiron West of San Marcos, and Jacobs Engineering of Oakland, won the bid for the second design-build construction package on December 11, 2014. Dragados/Flatiron/Jacobs submitted a bid of $1,365,335,890 to design and build the  stretch from the south end of Fresno to near the Tulare-Kings county line and was deemed the "apparent best value" bidder by the Authority. The winning bid came well below the range of $1.5 billion to $2 billion that was forecast by engineers and consultants working for the rail authority due to their innovative plan for cutting-and-filling instead of more expensive construction alternatives. This plan however was deemed impossible due to soil and hydrological conditions on site and the plan was reverted back to its original designs.

CP4. Five construction teams competed for this  segment. This section was estimated to cost $400–500 million. In January 2016 the apparent best value bid of $347.5 million (about $50 to $150 less than the estimated cost) was received from California Rail Builders(a consortium led by Ferrovial Agroman US Corp, an American subsidiary of Spain's Ferrovial S.A., also including Eurostudios, a Spanish engineering firm, and Othon Inc., a Houston-based engineering and environmental consulting company). The California Rail Builders bid was $347.5 million. The contract awarded includes an additional $107 million for utility relocation costs for electric, gas and communication lines. This project has had the least issues out of all of the current construction packages and is set to be completed by March 2023.

The construction segment now ends on the north side of Shafter due to the need to negotiate routes through Shafter and northern Bakersfield. The agreement between the cities and the Authority gave the parties until January 2016 to come up with the new alignment. The Poplar Avenue to Bakersfield Locally Generated Alternative was signed by the Authority's CEO on October 31, 2019 and as of May 2022, geotechnical work has begun taking place.

Extending initial San Joaquin Valley construction
In August 2022, contracts for advanced design work, right-of-way mapping, and identification of utility relocation work in the Merced-Madera and the Shafter to Bakersfield (Locally Generated Alternative) segments were approved. Construction will only begin once the design and land has been acquired. This reflects a change from the approach taken with the first four construction packages. Utility relocations will also begin as land is purchased to speed the construction process and avoid delays.

The Merced to Madera extension design contract ($41 million) was awarded to Stantec Consulting Services Inc., for approximately 33.9 mi. with 40 structures. The Shafter to Bakersfield (Locally Generated Alternative) extension design contract ($44.9 million) was awarded to HNTB for approximately 18.5 mi. with 31 structures. These design contracts are expected to last into 2024.

Other San Joaquin Valley constructions
The design contract for the central valley stations was awarded on October 20, 2022.

In addition, a large parcel will be needed for a rail yard, train sheds, machine shops, and other buildings for work on the tracks and trainsets in the Heavy Maintenance Facility (HMF). The counties of Fresno, Madera, Merced, Kings, and Kern all have expressed some interest in being selected for the site, since it is expected to provide up to 1500 good paying jobs.

Statewide connectivity projects
According to the Authority: "Connectivity or ‘Bookend’ Projects refer to the billions of dollars in infrastructure investment throughout the state that are part of the California High-Speed Rail system. These funds will strengthen and improve existing rail networks, while also connecting them with California’s future high-speed rail system. Senate Bill (SB) 1029 passed by the California Legislature and signed by Governor Brown in July 2012, invests almost $2 billion from the Safe, Reliable, High-Speed Passenger Train Bond Act for the 21st Century (Proposition 1A) into transit, commuter, and intercity rail projects across the state. This funding leverages approximately $5 billion in additional funding for these projects."

Major "bookend" investments are underway to the north and south:
The Caltrain electrification "bookend" investment in the Bay Area (as well as grade separations, etc.) is proceeding, and is expected to be completed in late 2024.
A "bookend" investment in the "Link US" project (Phase A) will shortly begin construction for Los Angeles Union Station. Phase B still needs to be funded.

Other connectivity projects partly funded by the Authority are:

Bay Area Caltrain Advanced Signal System (CBOSS/Positive Train Control)
Bay Area Central Subway
Bay Area Maintenance Shop and Yard Improvements
Bay Area Millbrae Station Track Improvement and Car Purchase
Central Valley Sacramento Intermodal Facility High-Speed
Central Valley San Joaquin Corridor, Merced to Le Grand Segment 1
Central Valley Stockton Passenger Track Extension
Central Valley/Los Angeles Metrolink High-Speed Rail Readiness Program
Los Angeles Metrolink Positive Train Control
Los Angeles Positive Train Control, Los Angeles to Fullerton Triple Track
Los Angeles Positive Train Control, Moorpark to San Onofre
Los Angeles Regional Connector Transit Corridor
San Diego Blue Line Light Rail Improvements
San Diego North San Diego County Transit District, Positive Train Control
San Diego Positive Train Control, San Onofre to San Diego

Construction package details

CP1 (Madera–Fresno section)
CP1 includes 32 miles (51,5 km) from Avenue 17 north of Madera to East American Avenue south of Fresno. The contract was awarded August 16, 2013, and a Notice Proceed was given on Oct. 15, 2013. Groundbreaking was on 6 January 2015 in Fresno. 

As of December 2022, 16 structures and 2 miles of guideway were complete, 10 structures and 16 miles of guideway were under construction, and construction had yet to begin on a remaining 7 structures and 14 miles of guideway.

CP2-3 (Fresno-Tulare/Kern section)
CP2-3 includes 65 miles (104,6 km) from East American Avenue south of Fresno to 1 mile (1,6 km) north of the Tulare / Kern County border. The contract was awarded June 10, 2015, and a Notice Proceed was given on July 25, 2015. The contractor is the joint venture of Dragados USA/Flatiron Construction. Groundbreaking took place in August 2018. 

As of December 2022, 14 structures and 33 miles of guideway were complete, 18 structures and 15 miles of guideway were under construction, and construction had yet to begin on a remaining 17 structures and 17 miles of guideway.

CP4 (County Line-Poplar Avenue section)
CP4 includes 22 miles (35,4 km) adjoining the end of CP2-3 to the intersection of Poplar / Madera Avenue northwest of Shafter. The contract was awarded February 29, 2016, and a Notice Proceed was given on April 16, 2016. 

As of December 2022, 6 structures and 14 miles of guideway were complete, and all remaining 5 structures and 8 miles of guideway were under construction.
Construction Completion is scheduled for March 1, 2023 with Final Completion scheduled for May 3, 2023.

Current details are available on the Authority's CP4 package webpage.

Further study

The Authority's Build HSR website contains detailed information and progress documents on the construction of the HSR infrastructure.

References

External links 

 California High-Speed Rail Authority
 California High-Speed Rail Authority's construction pages

California High-Speed Rail
Electric railways in California
High-speed railway lines in the United States
Passenger rail transportation in California
Proposed railway lines in California
2029 in rail transport
Megaprojects
High-speed railway lines under construction
Transportation buildings and structures in Madera County, California
Buildings and structures under construction in the United States
High-speed trains of the United States
Rail junctions in the United States